McIntosh is an unincorporated community in Pike County, in the U.S. state of Missouri.

The community has the name of William McIntosh, the original owner of the site.

References

Unincorporated communities in Pike County, Missouri
Unincorporated communities in Missouri